Darrell Steven Griffith (born June 16, 1958), also known by his nickname Dr. Dunkenstein, is an American former basketball player who spent his entire professional career with the Utah Jazz of the National Basketball Association from 1980 to 1991.  He played collegiately at the University of Louisville.

High school and college
Griffith starred at Louisville Male High School and was heavily recruited by colleges all across the country.  In fact, Griffith reportedly turned down an offer to forego college and sign with the ABA's Kentucky Colonels. He decided to attend his hometown school, the University of Louisville, much to the delight of local fans.

He didn't disappoint, delivering the school's first-ever NCAA men's basketball championship in 1980.  He scored 23 points in the Cardinals' 59–54 victory over UCLA in the championship game.  Due to his strong performance, he was named Most Outstanding Player of the Final Four.  Griffith totaled 825 points in his senior season, setting a school record.  For his efforts, he was named First Team All-American by the Associated Press and was given the Wooden Award as the best college basketball player in the nation.  He left college as Louisville's all-time leading scorer with 2,333 points in his career.  His jersey number, 35, was retired during ceremonies after the 1980 season.

Professional career
Utah selected Griffith with the second overall pick in the 1980 NBA draft.  The Jazz had recently moved to Salt Lake City from New Orleans, and the team needed a star to replace legendary shooting guard Pete Maravich.  Griffith accepted the challenge, averaging 20.6 points per game in his first season and earning the NBA's Rookie of the Year award.

For the next four seasons, Griffith teamed with small forward Adrian Dantley to form one of the highest-scoring duos in the league.  With defensive support from center Mark Eaton and point guard Rickey Green, the Jazz improved dramatically, winning the Midwest Division title in 1983–84 and qualifying for the NBA playoffs for the first time ever.  Individually, Griffith transformed his offensive game, adding long-distance shooting skills to his aerial acrobatics.  He led the league in three-point shooting (36.1 percent) and set an NBA record for most three-pointers made in a single season (91).  His new abilities earned him a new nickname: Utah's play-by-play announcer Hot Rod Hundley began calling him "The Golden Griff".

The following season (1984–85) was the best of Griffith's career.  He averaged a career-high 22.6 points per game, and broke his own league record by sinking 92 three-point shots.  During the year, he passed Joey Hassett as the all-time NBA leader for most career three-pointers.  He also continued his high-flying ways, representing the Jazz in the 1984 and 1985 NBA Slam Dunk Contests.

However, the team changed dramatically in the mid-1980s with the emergence of Karl Malone and John Stockton as Utah's top offensive weapons.  Dantley was traded away and Griffith suffered from injuries. ("Dr. Dunkenstein was paying his toll", he once said in an interview.) He missed the entire 1985–86 season due to a stress fracture in his foot, and would lose his starting position when he returned. Griffith would need an operation on his left knee in March 1988, causing him to miss the remainder of that season. He managed to reclaim his starting spot for most of the 1988–89 season, but lost it permanently the following year.  His playing time gradually decreased until his retirement in 1991.  He scored 12,391 total points over the course of his 10-year professional career – all with the Jazz.  The franchise recognized his contributions by retiring his jersey number 35 on December 4, 1993.

Griffith is now a special assistant to the President of the University of Louisville.

NBA career statistics

Regular season

|-
| style="text-align:left;"|
| style="text-align:left;"|Utah
| 81 ||  || 35.4 || .464 || .192 || .716 || 3.6 || 2.4 || 1.3 || .5 || 20.6
|-
| style="text-align:left;"|
| style="text-align:left;"|Utah
| 80 || 79 || 32.5 || .482 || .288 || .697 || 3.8 || 2.3 || 1.2 || .4 || 19.8
|-
| style="text-align:left;"|
| style="text-align:left;"|Utah
| 77 || 76 || 36.2 || .484 || .288 || .679 || 3.9 || 3.5 || 1.8 || .4 || 22.2
|-
| style="text-align:left;"|
| style="text-align:left;"|Utah
| 82 || 82 || 32.3 || .490 || .361 || .696 || 4.1 || 3.5 || 1.4 || .3 || 20.0
|-
| style="text-align:left;"|
| style="text-align:left;"|Utah
| 78 || 78 || 35.6 || .457 || .358 || .725 || 4.4 || 3.1 || 1.7 || .4 || 22.6
|-
| style="text-align:left;"|
| style="text-align:left;"|Utah
| 76 || 10 || 24.3 || .446 || .335 || .703 || 3.0 || 1.7 || 1.3 || .4 || 15.0
|-
| style="text-align:left;"|
| style="text-align:left;"|Utah
| 52 || 11 || 20.2 || .429 || .275 || .641 || 2.4 || 1.8 || 1.0 || .1 || 11.3
|-
| style="text-align:left;"|
| style="text-align:left;"|Utah
| 82 || 73 || 29.0 || .446 || .311 || .780 || 4.0 || 1.6 || 1.0 || .3 || 13.8
|-
| style="text-align:left;"|
| style="text-align:left;"|Utah
| 82 || 1 || 17.6 || .464 || .372 || .654 || 2.0 || .8 || .8 || .2 || 8.9                                                                                                                                                
|-
| style="text-align:left;"|
|style="text-align:left;"|Utah
| 75 || 2 || 13.4 || .391 || .348 || .756 || 1.2 || .5 || .6 || .1 || 5.7
|- class="sortbottom"
| style="text-align:center;" colspan="2"|Career
| 765 || 412 || 28.0 || .463 || .332 || .707 || 3.3 || 2.1 || 1.2 || .3 || 16.2

Playoffs

|-
| style="text-align:left;"|1984
| style="text-align:left;"|Utah
| 11 ||  || 37.9 || .443 || .356 || .688 || 5.9 || 3.7 || 1.7 || .2 || 19.2
|-
| style="text-align:left;"|1985
| style="text-align:left;"|Utah
| 10 || 10 || 34.0 || .456 || .361 || .720 || 2.9 || 2.5 || 1.2 || .5 || 17.5
|-
| style="text-align:left;"|1987
| style="text-align:left;"|Utah
| 5 || 0 || 20.8 || .369 || .400 || .737 || 2.4 || 1.6 || 1.2 || .4 || 13.6
|-
| style="text-align:left;"|1989
| style="text-align:left;"|Utah
| 3 || 0 || 23.7 || .408 || .316 ||  || 4.0 || .0 || 1.3 || .3 || 15.3
|-
| style="text-align:left;"|1990
| style="text-align:left;"|Utah
| 5 || 0 || 19.4 || .452 || .556 || .800 || 4.2 || .6 || 1.2 || .2 || 9.4
|-
| style="text-align:left;"|1991
| style="text-align:left;"|Utah
| 3 || 0 || 3.0 || .714 ||  ||  || .7 || .0 || .0 || .0 || 3.3
|- class="sortbottom"
| style="text-align:center;" colspan="2"|Career
| 37 || 10 || 28.1 || .438 || .371 || .711 || 3.8 || 2.1 || 1.3 || .3 || 15.1

See also
 List of University of Louisville people
 List of people from the Louisville metropolitan area
 List of NBA players who have spent their entire career with one franchise

References

External links

1958 births
Living people
African-American basketball players
All-American college men's basketball players
American men's basketball players
Basketball players from Louisville, Kentucky
Louisville Cardinals men's basketball players
Louisville Male High School alumni
National Basketball Association players with retired numbers
National Collegiate Basketball Hall of Fame inductees
Parade High School All-Americans (boys' basketball)
Shooting guards
Utah Jazz draft picks
Utah Jazz players
21st-century African-American people
20th-century African-American sportspeople